Serebryanka may refer to:

Populated places
 Serebryansk, formerly named Serebryanka, Kazakhstan
 Serebryanka, Gaynsky District, Russia
 Serebryanka, Amur Oblast, Russia

Rivers
Serebryanka (Moscow), a tributary of the Khapilovka in Moscow and Moscow Oblast, Russia
Serebryanka (Moscow Oblast), a tributary of the Ucha in Pushkinsky District, Moscow Oblast, Russia
Serebryanka (Sverdlovsk Oblast), a tributary of the Chusovaya in Sverdlovsk Oblast, Russia

Other uses
 Serebryanka, a liquid waste tanker associated with Russian nuclear-powered icebreakers